Batavia, Wisconsin is an unincorporated community in the Town of Scott, in Sheboygan County, Wisconsin, United States, along Wisconsin Highway 28.

History
The origin of the “Batavia” moniker most likely comes from Batavia, New York.

Geography
Batavia is approximately 5 mi. (8 km) northwest from Random Lake and 5.5 mi. (9 km) southwest from Adell.

Images

References

B
B